The Department of Defence is a department of the South African government. It oversees the South African National Defence Force, the armed forces responsible for defending South Africa.

 the Minister of Defence and Military Veterans is Thandi Modise.

Organisation and Structure

The Macro-Structure of the Department of Defence as Approved by the Minister of Defence on 15 August 2008 is below:

See also
 South African National Defence Force
 Minister of Defence and Military Veterans (South Africa)

References

External links
 Department of Defence 

1912 establishments in South Africa
Government agencies established in 1912
Defence
South Africa
Military of South Africa